Konecchlumí is a municipality and village in Jičín District in the Hradec Králové Region of the Czech Republic. It has about 400 inhabitants.

Administrative parts
The village of Kamenice is an administrative part of Konecchlumí.

References

External links

Villages in Jičín District